Stinky Little Gods is the debut album from desert rock band Fatso Jetson.

Track listing

Personnel
Mario Lalli – guitar, vocals, lap steel guitar
Tony Tornay – drums
Larry Lalli – bass

Credits
Recorded and Mixed by Mike Thuney and Fatso Jetson at Rhythm & Brews, Indio, Calif.

Cover Art by Fernando Munoz (Viva La Poachers!)

Band Photo by Stacey Grouix

References 

Fatso Jetson albums
SST Records albums
1995 debut albums